Capitán Juan Pagé is a village and rural municipality in the Rivadavia department in Salta Province in northwestern Argentina. The village had 250 inhabitants (2010), most of which are Wichi.

References

Populated places in Salta Province